Angus "Gus" MacFarlane (February 19, 1925 – February 22, 1991) was the Liberal MP for Hamilton Mountain from 1974 to 1979. He served as Chief Government Whip from 1977 to 1979.

He was born in Montreal, Quebec. MacFarlane served as flying officer in the Royal Canadian Air Force during World War II. He was defeated when he ran for reelection to the House of Commons in 1979 and 1980.

References 
 

1925 births
1991 deaths
Anglophone Quebec people
Liberal Party of Canada MPs
Members of the House of Commons of Canada from Ontario
Politicians from Montreal